Tirtha Bahadur Lama is a member of 2nd Nepalese Constituent Assembly. He won Kavre–1 seat in CA assembly, 2013 from Nepali Congress.

References

Nepali Congress politicians from Bagmati Province
Living people
Year of birth missing (living people)
Members of the 2nd Nepalese Constituent Assembly
Members of the Provincial Assembly of Bagmati Province